Alliphis is a genus of mites in the family Eviphididae. There are about five described species in Alliphis.

Species
These five species belong to the genus Alliphis:
 Alliphis carinatus
 Alliphis chirophorus Willmann, 1956
 Alliphis halleri (G. & R.Canestrini, 1881)
 Alliphis sculpturatus Karg, 1963
 Alliphis siculus (Oudemans, 1905)

References

Mesostigmata
Articles created by Qbugbot